Federal Route 204, or Jalan Gemang-Kampung Labu, is a federal road in Kelantan, Malaysia.

Features
At most sections, the Federal Route 204 was built under the JKR R5 road standard, allowing maximum speed limit of up to 90 km/h.

List of junctions and towns

References

Malaysian Federal Roads